The Beltoise BT01 is an electric GT race car built by Beltoise eTechnology. It was also presented at the 2022 Paris Motor Show.

Overview
It was developed in collaboration with Spark Racing Technology, specialists in Formula E and Extreme E electric racing vehicles.

A road version is expected, but will initially be built for circuit use only. After the first seven BT01s have been built, Beltoise will produce a second racing version to meet the FIA standards required for competition homologation, with a run of 20 models planned from 2023 in France and internationally.

Beltoise eTechnology plans to build between 150 and 200 units of the BT01 over a five-year period worldwide, with an estimated price tag of around £130,000.

Media
The Beltoise BT01 was added to the Asphalt 8: Airborne game in the "Ninth Anniversary Update" as a low class C car.

References

Sports cars
Racing cars